The 1892 general election in Ireland took place from 4–26 July 1892. This was the first general election in Ireland following the split in the Irish Parliamentary Party caused by Charles Stewart Parnell's relationship with Katharine O'Shea, who had been married at the beginning of their relationship. The ensuing scandal saw the Party split into rival wings; the anti-Parnellite Irish National Federation, and the pro-Parnellite Irish National League. Parnell later died in October 1891 of a heart attack.

In spite of the split within the Irish Nationalist parties their vote held up remarkably well, and together they received 297,258 of the 385,115 votes cast in Ireland, and 81 of Irelands 101 seats.

Irish and Liberal Unionists made small gains in Ulster and around Dublin, resulting in them winning a further 4 seats. It was the first election to be contested by the newly formed Irish Unionist Alliance under Edward James Saunderson.

The Irish Nationalist parties went on to support William Ewart Gladstone's attempt to form a minority Liberal government. As Prime Minister, Gladstone once again attempted to push for Irish Home Rule.

Not included in the totals are the two Dublin University seats, which were retained by the Irish Unionist party.

Results

See also
 History of Ireland (1801–1923)

References

1886
Ireland
July 1892 events
1892 elections in Ireland